Anarchist Manifesto (or The World's First Anarchist Manifesto) is a work by Anselme Bellegarrigue, notable for being the first manifesto of anarchism. It was written in 1850, two years after his participation in the French Revolution of 1848, and ten years after Pierre-Joseph Proudhon's seminal What Is Property?.
 It was translated into English by Paul Sharkey and republished in 2002 as a 42-page political pamphlet by the Kate Sharpley Library with an introduction placing the manifesto in historical context by Anarchist Studies editor Sharif Gemie.

See also 
 The Communist Manifesto
 An Anarchist Manifesto
 List of books about anarchism

References

Publication history 
Anselme Bellegarrigue,  Manifeste de l'Anarchie, L'Anarchie, Journal de l'Ordre, Issue 1, April 1850.

Solneman, KHZ (1977). An Anarchist Manifesto. Frankfurt: McKay-Gassellshaft

Books about anarchism
History of anarchism
Political manifestos
Individualist anarchist publications
1850 books
1850 in politics
Anarchist manifestos